Olli-Pekka Karjalainen (born 7 March 1980 in Töysä) is a Finnish former hammer thrower. The 1998 World Junior Champion, Karjalainen is the world junior record holder with 78.33 metres (7.26 kg). His personal best throw is 83.30, achieved in July 2004 in Lahti.

European Championships 2006 
Karjalainen took his first medal at the 2006 European Championships by throwing 80.84. He finished second, but became the Champion in 2014 as IAAF decided to strip Ivan Tskikhan of Belarus of the gold medal for doping. Karjalainen was awarded with the gold medal in a ceremony arranged at the 2014 Finland-Sweden athletics international in Helsinki.

Achievements

References

External links
 

1980 births
Athletes (track and field) at the 2000 Summer Olympics
Athletes (track and field) at the 2004 Summer Olympics
Athletes (track and field) at the 2008 Summer Olympics
European Athletics Championships medalists
Finnish male hammer throwers
Living people
Olympic athletes of Finland
People from Töysä
Sportspeople from South Ostrobothnia